"Mother Nature's Son" is a song by the English rock band the Beatles from their 1968 double album The Beatles (also known as "the White Album"). The song was written primarily by Paul McCartney, and credited to Lennon–McCartney. It was inspired by a lecture given by the Maharishi Mahesh Yogi while the Beatles were in India. The same lecture inspired Lennon's song "Child of Nature", the tune of which he later re-used for "Jealous Guy". Although credited to the group, the song was performed by McCartney alone (with a brass arrangement by George Martin), while the other Beatles were working on other "White Album" songs.

According to Paul McCartney he was inspired by Nat King Cole's song "Nature Boy" he heard growing up. He wrote the song in Liverpool when he visited his father.

Recording
McCartney recorded the song during the height of the tensions that marred the sessions for the White Album. On 9 August 1968, he recorded 25 takes singing and playing acoustic guitar simultaneously. Take 24 was perceived to be the best (take 2 later appeared on Anthology 3). McCartney recorded overdubs of timpani, another guitar, fingers slapping on a book and drums on 20 August, when George Martin's orchestral contributions were also added. The drums were put halfway down an uncarpeted corridor with the microphones at the far end, resulting in a bongo-like staccato sound. John Lennon did not play on the recording, but McCartney said he contributed some words to the song in India.  When Lennon (who hated McCartney recording without the rest of the band) and Ringo Starr walked into the studio after McCartney had finished, "you could have cut the atmosphere with a knife", recalled engineer Ken Scott.

Legacy
Coinciding with the 50th anniversary of its release, Jacob Stolworthy of The Independent listed "Mother Nature's Son" at number 15 in his ranking of the White Album's 30 tracks. He praised McCartney's vocals, writing "the anguish [in them] alone makes this one of the album's most emotional songs."

Personnel
Personnel per Ian MacDonald:
Paul McCartney – double-tracked vocal, acoustic guitars, timpani, bass drum, book slaps 
Unknown – two trumpets, two trombones

Covers and mashups
Mikey Erg recorded a pop-punk influenced cover of the song on his 2020 EP "Bon Voyage."
Jack White covered the song at the White House when McCartney was being given the Gershwin Prize on 2 June 2010.
Ramsey Lewis covered the song and used it as the title of his 1968 album Mother Nature's Son. The album includes other Beatles songs.
Harry Nilsson covered the song in 1969 for his album Harry.
John Denver covered the song on his Grammy winning An Evening with John Denver album, it was also on his 1972 album Rocky Mountain High, and after his death it became the title of a biography of Denver by John Collis.
Gryphon covered the song in 1974 on the album Raindance.
Sheryl Crow covered it for the movie I Am Sam.
Danger Mouse included a sample of the song in his "mashup" version of the Jay-Z song "December 4th" for his The Grey Album.
DJ Reset used it along with Slick Rick's "La-Di-Da-Di" for the "mashup" song "Mother Nature's Rick".
Brad Mehldau covered the song in a medley on his album Largo and also on the album Don't Explain with tenor saxophonist Joel Frahm.
Phish covered the song on 31 October 1994 as part of a full set covering the entire White Album. It can be found on Live Phish Volume 13.

Notes

References

External links 
 

1968 songs
The Beatles songs
Songs written by Lennon–McCartney
Song recordings produced by George Martin
Songs published by Northern Songs
The Beatles and India
British folk songs
John Denver songs
Harry Nilsson songs